Siegfried Wolf can refer to:

 Siegfried Wolf (footballer), German footballer
 Siegfried Reginald Wolf, Austrian chess master